The 2010 Atlanta Falcons season was the 45th season for the team in the National Football League. 

The Falcons improved on their 2009 record, winning 13 games. The team won their first NFC South title since 2004, a bye in the first round of the playoffs, and the top seed in the NFC. In the playoffs, the Falcons fell to the eventual Super Bowl XLV champion Green Bay Packers in the NFC Divisional Round 21–48.

Offseason 

Falcons re-signed WR Brian Finneran to a 1-year deal on February 11, 2010.

Falcons re-signed CB Brian Williams to a 1-year deal on March 4, 2010.

Falcons signed CB Dunta Robinson to a 6-year deal on March 5, 2010.

Falcons re-signed LS Joe Zelenka to a deal on March 8, 2010.

Falcons re-signed CB Brent Grimes to a deal on March 9, 2010.

Falcons cut CB Tye Hill and signed S Matt Giordano on March 16, 2010.

2010 NFL Draft 

After finishing the season 9–7 and out of the playoffs, the Falcons will pick 19th in the draft. The Falcons traded their second round pick to the Kansas City Chiefs after trading for tight end Tony Gonzalez, and their seventh round pick to the St. Louis Rams for cornerback Tye Hill.

Staff

Final roster

Schedule

Preseason 
The Falcons preseason schedule was announced on March 31, 2010.

Regular season

Postseason

Standings

Regular season results

Week 1: at Pittsburgh Steelers 

The Falcons began their season at Heinz Field for an interconference duel against the Pittsburgh Steelers. The Steelers were without quarterback Ben Roethlisberger who was suspended for the first four games of the season. Dennis Dixon started in his place. The Steelers received the opening kick and drove 42 yards in 11 plays with Dixon going 4/4 for 21 yards on the drive, that led to Steelers kicker Jeff Reed nailing a 52-yard field goal, the longest field goal in Heinz Field history. The Falcons offense was non-existent almost entirely in the first half, going three-and- out on their first two drives. In the second quarter, following the Falcons second punt, the Steelers drove 28 yards to the Falcons 35, but Dixon was intercepted by Falcons linebacker Mike Petersen. The Falcons drove 44 yards to the Steelers 28, but Matt Bryant missed a 46-yard field goal. Jeff Reed then missed a 55-yarder. The Falcons drove 24 yards to the Steelers 31-yard line, and Bryant was successful from 48 yards out as the game went to halftime tied at 3-3.

Atlanta drove 55 yards in 13 plays on the first drive of the 2nd quarter, which took 4:20 off the clock, to take the lead on Bryant's 39-yard field goal. However, Pittsburgh would respond, driving 67 yards on 6 plays, taking 3:47 off the clock, and tying the game with Reed's 34-yard field goal. In the fourth quarter, the Steelers would get the lead again, driving 67 yards on 10 plays taking 5:07 off the clock, on Reed's 34-yard field goal, yet the Falcons would strike back. Ryan engineered a 13-play, 73-yard drive taking 5:30 off the clock, and ending with Bryant's 23-yard field goal, tying the score at 9-9 with 3:28 remaining. After a Pittsburgh punt, Troy Polamalu intercepted Matt Ryan at the Atlanta 30. In a golden opportunity to win the game, Pittsburgh drove 9 yards to the Atlanta 21, but Jeff Reed missed a 40-yard field goal wide ride with 0:43 left. Atlanta drained the clock, sending the game into overtime. Atlanta had possession first in overtime, but punted after 5 plays. It was a bad punt, going only 36 yards to midfield. Pittsburgh delivered the final strike in overtime as running back Rashard Mendenhall got the game-winning 50-yard touchdown run, on Pittsburgh's first play.

With the loss, Atlanta began their season at 0–1.

Week 2: vs. Arizona Cardinals 

Hoping to rebound from their loss to the Steelers the Falcons played at home an NFC duel against the Arizona Cardinals. In the first quarter Atlanta took the early lead as QB Matt Ryan completed a 7-yard TD pass to WR Roddy White, followed in the second quarter by kicker Matt Bryant hitting a 24-yard field goal. Arizona would reply with RB Tim Hightower scampering 80 yards for a TD run, but Atlanta increased their lead when Ryan threw a 19-yard TD pass to FB Jason Snelling, followed by Snelling getting a 1-yard TD run. In the third quarter the Falcons continued to dominate the game when Ryan completed a 12-yard touchdown pass to WR Brian Finneran, followed by Bryan nailing a 35-yard field goal. In the fourth quarter Atlanta scored once again with FB Jason Snelling getting a 7-yard TD run.

With the win, Atlanta improved to 1–1.

Week 3: at New Orleans Saints 

Coming off their win over the Cardinals the Falcons traveled to Louisiana Superdome for an NFC South rivalry match against the New Orleans Saints.
The Falcons trailed early when QB Drew Brees made a 2-yard TD pass to TE Jeremy Shockey. The Falcons replied with QB Matt Ryan making a 13-yard TD pass to TE Tony Gonzalez. The Saints re-took the lead with Brees finding WR Lance Moore on an 80-yard TD pass. But the Falcons replied in the second quarter driving 72 yards in 19 plays, taking 10:39 off the clock ending with RB Michael Turner plunging into the end zone on a 1-yard TD run. The Falcons took the lead when kicker Matt Bryant booted a 23-yard field goal. But they fell behind with Brees finding Moore again on a 16-yard TD pass. The Falcons we're able to retake the lead when Ryan rifled a 22-yard TD pass to WR Roddy White. However, Drew Brees drove the Saints into field goal range and they would tie the game with kicker Garrett Hartley making a 32-yard field goal. In overtime, the Saints drove down to the goal line but kicker Hartley missed a 29-yard, chip shot field goal. Matt Ryan drove the Falcons back down the other direction and Matt Bryant hit a 46-yard field goal to give the Falcons the win.

With the win, not only the Falcons improved to 2–1 but finally won their first game in New Orleans since 2002.

Week 4: vs. San Francisco 49ers 

Hoping to increase their winning streak after a win against the Saints, the Falcons played inside their dome for an NFC duel against the San Francisco 49ers. In the first quarter the Falcons trailed early with QB Alex Smith making a 12-yard TD pass to TE Vernon Davis. The Falcons problems continued when Michael Koenen's punt was blocked and recovered in their own endzone by DB Taylor Mays, putting the 49ers up 14–0. Then the Falcons replied with QB Matt Ryan completing an 8-yard TD pass to WR Harry Douglas. Then the Falcons took the lead with three field goals from kicker Matt Bryant. He made a 37-yard field goal near the end of the 2nd quarter and a 31-yard field goad in the 3rd. Under two minutes to play with the Falcons trailing 14–13, Ryan threw an interception to the 49ers' Nate Clements who appeared to be headed to the end zone and clinch the win. However wide receiver Roddy White chased him down and stripped the football which was recovered by Atlanta's Harvey Dahl. Ryan then engineered a drive in the other direction and Bryant kicks a 43-yard field goal with two seconds left giving the Falcons another win.

With the win, Atlanta improved to 3–1.

Week 5: at Cleveland Browns 

Coming off their win over the 49ers the Falcons flew to Cleveland Browns Stadium for an Interconference duel against the Cleveland BrownsAfter a scoreless 1st quarter, the Falcons got things started in the 2nd quarter. Matt Bryant converted a 24-yard field goal. The Browns replied and took the lead with QB Seneca Wallace's 19-yard TD pass to RB Peyton Hillis. The Falcons tried to cut the lead when Bryant made a 30-yard field goal, but was expanded again in the 3rd quarter with kicker Phil Dawson hitting a 19-yard field goal. After that, the Falcons scored when QB Matt Ryan connected with WR Roddy White on a 45-yard TD pass. The game was a defensive drag out the rest of the way. In the 4th quarter DE Kroy Biermann returned an interception 41 yards to the endzone for a touchdown, sealing the Falcons' 4th straight win.

With the win, Atlanta improved to 4–1.

Week 6: at Philadelphia Eagles 

Hoping to increase their winning streak the Falcons flew to Lincoln Financial Field for an NFC duel against the Philadelphia Eagles. In the first quarter the Falcons trailed early as WR DeSean Jackson raced through the defense on a 31-yard TD run. Later, QB Kevin Kolb connected with him on a 34-yard TD pass. The Falcons' secondary continued to struggle when Kolb found WR Jeremy Maclin on an 8-yard TD pass. Facing, a 21-0 deficit, the Falcons replied with QB Matt Ryan hitting TE Tony Gonzalez on a 1-yard TD pass. This was followed in the third quarter by kicker Matt Bryant hitting a 26-yard field goal. However, the Falcons fell further behind when Kolb found Maclin again on an amazing 83-yard TD pass. The Falcons replied with Ryan hitting Gonzalez, again, on a 13-yard TD pass. The Eagles pulled away with All-Pro kicker David Akers making a 30-yard field goal.

With the loss, Atlanta fell to 4–2.

Week 7: vs. Cincinnati Bengals 

Hoping to rebound from their loss to the Eagles the Falcons played inside their dome for an inter-conference duel against the Bengals. In the first quarter the Falcons took the lead as QB Matt Ryan connected on a 3-yard TD pass to unheralded WR Brian Finneran. But the Bengals replied with kicker Mike Nugent making a 20-yard field goal. The Falcons dominated the second quarter, going on a 17-0 run. Kicker Matt Bryant hitting a 45-yard field goal. Then Ryan found deep threat WR Roddy White, who would eventually lead the NFL with 115 receptions, on a 43-yard TD pass, followed by eventual rushing yards leader, RB Michael Turner popping into the end zone on a 2-yard TD run. The Bengals rally in the third quarter going on a 22-0 run of their own. Nugent nailed a 33-yard field goal, followed by QB Carson Palmer completing a 19-yard TD pass to WR Terrell Owens. Then Palmer found WR Jordan Shipley on a laser 64-yard TD pass. (With a failed 2-point conversion) Then DB Adam Jones returned a fumble 59 yards to the endzone for a touchdown (With a failed two-point conversion). The Falcons pulled away in the fourth quarter with Ryan throwing an 11-yard TD pass to White. (With the 2-point conversion successful as Ryan passed to White) This was followed by Turner plunging into the end zone on a 3-yard TD run. The Falcons would concede only one touchdown after that as Palmer found WR Chad Ochocinco on an 8-yard TD pass.

With the win, Atlanta went into its bye week at 5–2.

Week 9: vs. Tampa Bay Buccaneers 

Coming off their bye week the Falcons returned inside their dome for an NFC South rivalry match against the Buccaneers. The Falcons took the lead as RB Michael Turner got a 2 and a 10-yard TD run. The Buccaneers replied with QB Josh Freeman completing a 14-yard TD pass to WR Arrelious Benn. The Falcons pulled ahead after kicker Matt Bryant got a 31-yard field goal, but the Buccaneers responded after Freeman found WR Mike Williams on a 58-yard TD pass. The Falcons continued to score in the third quarter after QB Matt Ryan threw a 5-yard TD pass to TE Michael Palmer, followed by Bryant hitting a 41-yard field goal. The Buccaneers responded after Micheal Spurlock returned a kickoff 89 yards for a touchdown.

With the win, the Falcons improved to 6–2.

Week 10: vs. Baltimore Ravens 

Coming off their divisional win over the Buccaneers, the Falcons stayed at home, donned their throwback uniforms, and played their Week 10 interconference duel with the Baltimore Ravens on Thursday night. After a scoreless first quarter, Atlanta delivered the opening punch in the second quarter as quarterback Matt Ryan found running back Jason Snelling on a 28-yard touchdown run, followed by a 28-yard field goal from kicker Matt Bryant.

The Falcons added onto their lead in the third quarter as a Brent Grimes interception set up Bryant booted a 51-yard field goal. The Ravens would answer with quarterback Joe Flacco completing a 5-yard touchdown pass to wide receiver Anquan Boldin. Atlanta struck back in the fourth quarter as Ryan found wide receiver Roddy White on a 4-yard touchdown pass. Baltimore took the lead as Flacco completed a 6-yard touchdown pass to wide receiver Derrick Mason, followed by a 9-yard touchdown pass to tight end Todd Heap, with 1:05 left. However, a 24-yard completion to Michael Jenkins and Ravens penalties set the Falcons up at the Ravens 33-yard line. Then, Ryan connected with White again on a 33-yard touchdown pass (with a failed two-point conversion) with 20 seconds left in the game, giving the Falcons a 26-21 lead. Flacco attempted a miracle win, but his last pass to T.J. Houshmendazeh was fumbled with 0:02 seconds left.

With the win, the Falcons improved to 7–2.

During halftime, Deion Sanders was inducted into the Falcons Ring of Honor.

Week 11: at St. Louis Rams 

Hoping to increase their winning streak the Falcons flew to Edward Jones Dome for an NFC duel with the Rams.
In the first quarter the Falcons trailed early after QB Sam Bradford completed a 25-yard TD pass to TE Michael Hoomanawanui. The Falcons replied with kicker Matt Bryant hitting a 42-yard field goal. Later, Rams kicker Josh Brown hit a 53-yard field goal; but they took the lead after Matt Ryan completed a 12-yard TD pass to WR Brian Finneran, followed by Bryant converting a 29 and a 24-yard field goal. The lead was narrowed when Bradford threw a 13-yard TD pass to WR Brandon Gibson, but the Falcons. increased their lead as Ryan threw a 2-yard TD pass to TE Justin Peelle. This was followed in the fourth quarter by Bryant nailing a 21-yard field goal, and with RB Michael Turner taking it in for a 39-yard TD run.

With the win, Atlanta improved to 8–2, increasing their NFC South lead.

Week 12: vs. Green Bay Packers 

The Falcons' eleventh game was an NFC duel with the Packers inside their dome. In the first quarter the Falcons took the lead as kicker Matt Bryant nailed a 38-yard field goal. The Packers replied as kicker Mason Crosby hit a 22-yard field goal. The Falcons had the only score of the second quarter with QB Matt Ryan firing a 4-yard TD pass to TE Tony Gonzalez with 0:08 seconds left in the half. On the play before the drive began, on a 4th-and-Goal at the 1-yard line, Aaron Rodgers fumbled with the Falcons recovering. The Packers responded in the third quarter when QB Aaron Rodgers scrambled 1 yard for a touchdown. Less than a minute into the 4th quarter, the Falcons got the lead back as RB Michael Turner punched it in from 1 yard out. However, the Packers replied with Rodgers' 10-yard TD pass to WR Jordy Nelson on 4th-and-goal with 0:56 left. It was their third 4th down conversion on the drive. On the ensuing kick a 40-yard kickoff return by Eric Weems with a 15-yard facemask penalty set the Falcons up at the Packers 49-yard line. Four short completions set up Bryant's game-winning 47-yard field goal. The Packers called timeout before the kick, however, but, Bryant's second attempt was good with 0:09 seconds left. It was his third game-winning field goal of the season. Greg Jennings' lateral attempt went out of bounds on the next drive, and the game was over.

With the win, Atlanta improved to 9–2.

Week 13: at Tampa Bay Buccaneers 

Hoping to increase their winning streak the Falcons flew to Raymond James Stadium for an NFC South rivalry match against the Buccaneers. The Falcons took the early lead as RB Michael Turner got a 5-yard TD run. But the Buccaneers replied with RB LeGarrette Blount getting a 6-yard TD run. The Falcons scored again with QB Matt Ryan getting a 17-yard TD pass to FB Ovie Mughelli, but Tampa Bay replied with QB Josh Freeman getting a 1-yard TD pass to WR Mike Williams. The Falcons trailed for the first time in the game with kicker Connor Barth nailing a 33-yard field goal, and with Earnest Graham making a 2-yard TD pass to TE John Gilmore. The Falcons responded with Eric Weems returning a kickoff 102 yards for a touchdown, and getting the lead back with Ryan getting a 9-yard TD pass to WR Michael Jenkins.

With the win, the Falcons improved to 10–2.

Week 14: at Carolina Panthers 

The Falcons' thirteenth game was an NFC South rivalry match against the Panthers. The Falcons commanded the first half as QB Matt Ryan completed a 4-yard TD pass to TE Tony Gonzalez, followed by RB Michael Turner getting a 1-yard TD run, and then with kicker Matt Bryant nailing a 39-yard field goal. The Panthers scored in the third quarter with RB Mike Goodson getting a 13-yard TD run, but the Falcons replied as Turner got a 3-yard TD run. The lead was narrowed as kicker John Kasay made a 36-yard field goal, but Atlanta pulled away as Turner got a 4-yard TD run.

With the win, Atlanta improved to 11–2.

Week 15: at Seattle Seahawks 

Looking to secure a playoff berth, the Falcons traveled to Seattle in their last regular-season road game to take on the Seahawks. Seattle took an early lead with a 1-yard TD run by Marshawn Lynch. Atlanta would later respond early in the second quarter with a Matt Ryan 3-yard TD pass to Jason Snelling, with Matt Bryant later adding a 27-yard field goal to take the lead. Seattle tied the game with a 38-yard field goal from Olindo Mare; however, the Falcons took the lead again with a Ryan 24-yard TD pass to Michael Jenkins to close the first half. On the Seahawks' first offensive possession of the second half, Matt Hasselbeck fumbled the football in the end-zone with defensive tackle Jonathan Babineaux recovering for a Falcons' touchdown. Atlanta would later add to their lead with a 25-yard Bryant field goal as well as a Ryan 24-yard TD pass to Roddy White. Seattle's only score of the second half came from backup quarterback Charlie Whitehurst with a 1-yard TD rush followed by a successful 2-point conversion with a Whitehurst pass to Ben Obomanu.

With the win, Atlanta improved to 12–2. Also, the Falcons secured a playoff berth early in the game due to Philadelphia's victory over the New York Giants.

Week 16: vs. New Orleans Saints 

Looking to win their division and capture the top seed in the NFC playoffs, the Falcons hosted the Saints in a Monday Night rematch of their Week 3 contest. New Orleans would score first with Garrett Hartley kicking a FG from 52 yards late in the first quarter. RB Pierre Thomas would add to the Saints' lead with a 2-yard TD run; however, Atlanta would respond with a Matt Ryan 7-yard TD pass to Roddy White to cut the lead to three. After a scoreless third quarter, the Falcons took the lead with Chauncey Davis returning an interception 26 yards for a touchdown. New Orleans reclaimed the lead late in the 4th with a Drew Brees 6-yard TD pass to Jimmy Graham. Atlanta attempted to come back; however, New Orleans held on for the win.

With the loss, Atlanta falls to 12–3, snapping their 8-game winning streak.

Week 17: vs. Carolina Panthers 

The Falcons' sixteenth game was a division rivalry rematch against the Panthers inside their dome. The Falcons commanded the first half as QB Matt Ryan got a 6-yard TD pass to TE Tony Gonzalez. This was followed by a 55-yard punt return for a touchdown by Eric Weems; then with Ryan completing a 14-yard TD pass to WR Roddy White. The Panthers tried to cut the lead with kicker John Kasay getting a 23-yard field goal, but the Falcons continued to score as kicker Matt Bryant made a 47-yard field goal, followed by RB Michael Turner getting a 3-yard TD run. The lead was narrowed as QB Jimmy Clausen connected to TE Jeff King on a 2-yard TD pass, but the Falcons held on for the easy win, finishing their regular season on a 13–3 record. The Falcons swept the Panthers for the 1st time since 2004.

Postseason results

NFC Divisional Round: vs. Green Bay Packers 

Entering the postseason as the NFC's #1 seed, the Falcons began their playoff run at home against the #6 Green Bay Packers, in a rematch of their Week 12 match-up. Atlanta delivered the game's opening strike in the first quarter with a 12-yard touchdown run from running back Michael Turner. The Packers answered in the second quarter as quarterback Aaron Rodgers completed a 6-yard touchdown pass to wide receiver Jordy Nelson, yet the Falcons immediately struck back as wide receiver Eric Weems returned the ensuing kickoff for a franchise postseason best 102 yards for a touchdown. Green Bay came right back with fullback John Kuhn getting a 1-yard touchdown run, Rodgers completing a 20-yard touchdown pass to wide receiver James Jones, and cornerback Tramon Williams returning an interception 70 yards for a touchdown.

The Packers added onto their lead in the third quarter as Rodgers got a 7-yard touchdown run, followed by his 7-yard touchdown pass to Kuhn. Atlanta tried to rally in the fourth quarter as quarterback Matt Ryan found wide receiver Roddy White on a 6-yard touchdown pass, yet Green Bay closed out their dominating night with Crosby getting a 43-yard field goal.

With the loss, the Falcons' season came to a disappointing end with an overall record of 13–4.

The 27-point loss was the worst loss by a top seed in Divisional Playoff game history. It was the second worst defeat by a top seed before a Super Bowl, with the worst being a 28–0 loss by the Los Angeles Rams to the Dallas Cowboys in the 1978 season.

References

External links 
 2010 Atlanta Falcons season at ESPN
 2010 Atlanta Falcons season at Pro Football Reference

Atlanta
NFC South championship seasons
Atlanta Falcons seasons
2010 in sports in Georgia (U.S. state)
2010 in Atlanta